A steroid hydroxylase is a class of hydroxylase enzymes involved in the biosynthesis of steroids.

See also
 Steroidogenic enzyme

Additional images

References

External links
 

EC 1.14
Steroids